Ditlev is a given name. Notable people with the name include:

Emilius Ditlev Bærentzen (1799–1868), Danish portrait painter and lithographer
Hans Ditlev Bendixsen (1842–1902), American shipbuilder on the West Coast of the United States
Ditlev Blunck (1798–1853), Danish painter associated with the Danish Golden Age
Reidar Ditlev Danielsen (1916–2000), Norwegian civil servant
John Ditlev-Simonsen (1898–2001), Norwegian sailor who competed in the 1936 Summer Olympics
Olaf Ditlev-Simonsen (1897–1978), Norwegian bandy player, footballer, sailor, sports administrator and businessperson
Per Ditlev-Simonsen (born 1932), Norwegian politician
Adolf Ditlev Jørgensen (1840–1897), Danish historian
Hans Ditlev Franciscus Linstow (1787–1851), Danish-born Norwegian architect
Haakon Ditlev Lowzow (1854–1915), Norwegian military officer and politician for the Liberal Party
Ditlev Gothard Monrad (1811–1887), Danish politician and bishop of Lolland-Falster
Nicolai Ditlev Ammon Ræder (1817–1884), Norwegian jurist and politician
Christian Ditlev Frederik Reventlow (1748–1827), Danish statesman and reformer
Christian Ditlev Reventlow (1671–1738), Danish diplomat and military leader
Christian Ditlev Reventlow (1710–1775), Danish Privy Councillor, nobleman and estate owner
Niels Ditlev Riegels (1755–1802), Danish historian, journalist and pamphleteer
Ditlev Ludvig Rogert (1742–1813), Danish songwriter, credited with composing Denmark's royal anthem
Karl Ditlev Rygh (1839–1915), Norwegian archaeologist and politician for the Conservative Party
Ditlev Vibe (1670–1731), Danish/Norwegian civil servant

See also
Sverre Ditlev-Simonsen & Co., an international shipping company based in Oslo